Junk is the debut studio album of Shinjuku Filth, released in 1995 by Iridium Records. On May 21, 1996 the album was reissued on Full Contact Records.

Reception

Aiding & Abetting called Junk a "strident, brutal and ultimately beautiful work" and that "Shinjuku Filth has sonic construction (and reconstruction) down, and has ventured into a few previously unexplored territory here." Jason Ankeny of AllMusic awarded the album three out of five stars and said "the music ranges from hard-body dance to more ambient soundscapes; the penultimate track is, of all things, a cover of the Split Enz chestnut "Log Cabin Fever." Sonic Boom said "part of the musical allurement is derived from the fact for once a band with extensive musical training is now experimenting with some of the more popular electronic musical styles and as an end result is advancing the genre beyond the tunnel vision sights of some of the other premier electronic club bands."

Track listing

Personnel 
Adapted from the Junk liner notes.

Black Lung
 Darrin Verhagen – keyboards

Additional performers
 Peter Breuer – instruments
 Paul McDermott – instruments
 Anthony Norris – instruments
 Paul Schütze – instruments
 Mark Stafford – instruments

Production and design
 Zalman Fishman – executive-producer
 Richard Grant (I+T=R) – design

Release history

References

External links 
 

1995 albums
Shinjuku Filth albums
Fifth Colvmn Records albums